The 2017 Port Adelaide Football Club season was the Port Adelaide Football Club's 21st season in the AFL. They also fielded a reserves team in the South Australian National Football League.

AFL

List changes

Retirements and delistings

Trades

National draft

Rookie draft

Squad

Season summary

Pre-season

Home and Away season

Finals

Ladder

SANFL

References

Port Adelaide Football Club seasons
2017 Australian Football League season